KUJJ (95.5 FM) is a radio station licensed to serve the community of McCall, Idaho. The station is owned by Inspirational Family Radio, Inc. It airs an adult contemporary music format.

The station was assigned the KUJJ call letters by the Federal Communications Commission on October 30, 2013.

References

External links
Official Website

UJJ (FM)
Radio stations established in 2014
2014 establishments in Idaho
Mainstream adult contemporary radio stations in the United States
Valley County, Idaho